Vanessa Maia Grigoriadis is an American journalist. Her work has been featured in The New York Times, Vanity Fair, and Rolling Stone among other publications.

Background
Grigoriadis is of Greek descent and grew up in New York City. When she was younger she played classical violin and danced. Grigoriadis graduated from Wesleyan University. She also spent a year studying the sociology of religion at Harvard University.

Career
Grigoriadis is a generalist writer for The New York Times Magazine, and Vanity Fair. Her feature Power Girls reportedly inspired the MTV reality series PoweR Girls. Her work does not cover one specific topic. She has been working on and off for the New York magazine since she graduated from college. Here, she began working as an editorial assistant and eventually worked her way up to becoming a contributing editor at the age of 25. In 2003, she was a writer on the Style desk at the New York Times.

Blurred Lines
In 2014, Grigoriadis wrote a cover story on Emma Sulkowicz, the Columbia student known for her Mattress Performance. That story grew into Grigoriadis's first book, Blurred Lines: Rethinking Sex, Power, and Consent on Campus. Published in September 2017, the book is an exploration of the changing attitudes toward consent on college campuses across the United States.

Awards and honors
Grigoriadis received the National Magazine Award in 2007 in profile writing for a profile of Karl Lagerfeld. She was nominated in 2008 for feature writing, a piece titled Gawker and the Rage of the Creative Underclass. She was also nominated for a Mirror Award for a profile of Arianna Huffington.

Bibliography

Books
 Blurred Lines: Rethinking Sex, Power, and Consent on Campus (2017)

Essays and reportage
Karl Lagerfeld, Boy Prince of Fashion, New York Magazine (2007 National Magazine Award winner)
Gawker and the Rage of the Creative Underclass, New York Magazine (2008 National Magazine Award nominee)
The Tragedy of Britney Spears Rolling Stone
Tory Burch's Ext Factor Vanity Fair
Blow Up the Box: Barry Diller's Story New York Magazine
The Passion of Nicki Minaj New York Times Magazine
An American Drug Lord in Acapulco Rolling Stone
Hollywood's Rising Class Vanity Fair
The ‘Sex Cult’ That Preached Empowerment New York Times Magazine

References

External links

New York Magazine bibliography

Living people
American women writers
Wesleyan University alumni
American women journalists
American people of Greek descent
Journalists from New York City
Year of birth missing (living people)
21st-century American women
Vanity Fair (magazine) people